Pierre-Nicolas Beauvallet (born in Le Havre on 21 June 1750 and died in Paris on 15 April 1818), was a French sculptor, draftsman and printmaker.

On 21 August 1793, he was appointed director of public works of the Commune of Paris. On 7 July 1794, he was received at the Club des Jacobins after having given a bust of Guillaume Tell proposed by Jacques-Louis David on a project of Collot d'Herbois.

He then worked for the restoration of medieval and Renaissance sculptures for the Musée national des Monuments Français of Alexandre Lenoir, including the famous Fontaine de Diane.

Main works
 Suzanne au bain, 1813, group, marble, Paris, Louvre
 Hygie, déesse de la santé soignant Mars, le dieu de la guerre
 Sully, statue, stone, Paris, palais Bourbon
 La Liberté sous les ruines de la Bastille, 1793
 La Force guidée par la raison ramène la Paix, le Commerce
 La Paix faisant hommage à la Liberté des prémices des faits de ses bienfaits
 La Tyrannie renversée, 1800

References
 Geneviève Bresc-Bautier, Isabelle Leroy-Jay Lemaistre, Musée du Louvre. département des sculptures du Moyen Âge, de la Renaissance et des temps modernes. Sculpture française II. Renaissance et temps modernes. vol. 1 Adam - Gois, Paris, 1998
 Catalogue d'exposition, Skulptur aus dem Louvre. Sculptures françaises néo-classiques. 1760 - 1830, Paris, museum of Louvre, 23 May - 3 September 1990
 Simone Hoog, Musée national de Versailles. Les sculptures. I- Le musée, Réunion des musées nationaux editions, Paris, 1993
 Pierre Kjellberg, Le Nouveau guide des statues de Paris, La Bibliothèque des Arts, Paris, 1988
 Exposition rétrospective des graveurs normands, exposition de portraits normands, catalogue, Rouen, Lecerf fils, 1911

External links
 

1750 births
1818 deaths
French draughtsmen
French printmakers
18th-century French sculptors
French male sculptors
19th-century French sculptors
Artists from Le Havre
19th-century French male artists
18th-century French male artists